Jean-Talon is a provincial electoral riding in the Capitale-Nationale region of Quebec, Canada.  It consists of part of the Sainte-Foy–Sillery–Cap-Rouge borough of Quebec City.

It was named after former French colonial administrator of New France, Jean Talon.

History
It was created for the 1966 election from Québec-Centre and parts of Québec-Est and Québec-Ouest electoral districts. The riding's current boundaries and those in 1966 share no territory in common, as the riding has continuously shifted westward throughout its history.

When the riding was created in 1966, it was located in the central part of Quebec City, and included the neighbourhoods of Old Quebec, Basse-Ville, Saint Roch, Saint-Sacrement and most of Saint-Jean-Baptiste and Montcalm. Today, the entirety of the 1966 Jean-Talon riding can be found in Taschereau, while the modern Jean-Talon riding was entirely in Louis-Hébert at the time.

The redistribution prior to the 1973 election saw the riding shift westward to accommodate the new riding of Taschereau which would become the city's new central riding. The riding lost the neighbourhoods of Old Quebec, Saint-Roch and Basse-Ville to Taschereau. In return, it gained the rest of Saint-Jean-Baptiste and Montcalm and the city of Sillery.

In the redistribution prior to the 1981 election, the riding lost a bit of the Saint-Jean-Baptiste neighbourhood while gaining much of the Saint-Louis neighbourhood of the city of Sainte-Foy.

In the redistributution prior to the 1994 election, the riding lost the remainder of the Saint-Jean-Baptiste neighbourhood and a large chunk of the Montcalm neighbourhood.

Prior to the 2003 election, the riding gained some more of Saint-Louis and half of the Cité-Universitaire neighbourhood of Sainte-Foy.

In the change from the 2001 to the 2011 electoral map, it gained the remainder of the Saint-Louis and Cité-Universitaire neighbourhoods and all of Plateau from Louis-Hébert, but lost territory to Vanier-Les Rivières and all of Monctcalm and half of Saint-Sacrement to Taschereau.

The riding is a traditional Liberal stronghold in the Capitale-Nationale region; however, this was broken with the election of Joëlle Boutin for the CAQ in the a by-election held on December 2, 2019.

Members of the Legislative Assembly / National Assembly

Election results

^ Change is from redistributed results. CAQ change is from ADQ.

|-
 
|Liberal
|Yves Bolduc
|align="right"|13,853
|align="right"|49.71
|align="right"|-8.78

|-

|}

 
|Liberal
|Yves Bolduc
|align="right"|12,039
|align="right"|58.49
|align="right"|+16.53

|-
 
|Liberal
|Philippe Couillard
|align="right"|13,732
|align="right"|41.96
|align="right"|-4.64

|-

|-

|-
|}
* Increase is from UFP

|-
 
|Liberal
|Margaret F. Delisle
|align="right"|15,475
|align="right"|45.60
|align="right"|+0.27

|-

|-

|-

|-
 
|Independent
|Robert Bonenfant
|align="right"|126	  	
|align="right"|0.37
|align="right"|-
|-
|}

^ PDS change is from NDP

References

External links
Information
 Elections Quebec

Election results
 Election results (National Assembly)

Maps
 2011 map (PDF)
 2001 map (Flash)
2001–2011 changes (Flash)
1992–2001 changes (Flash)
 Electoral map of Capitale-Nationale region
 Quebec electoral map, 2011

Provincial electoral districts of Quebec City
Quebec provincial electoral districts